Choila, sometimes Chhwela or Chhoyela (Nepali: छोयला) is a typical Newari dish that consists of spiced grilled buffalo meat. Though the dish is traditionally popular with water buffalo meat, nowadays mutton, chicken, duck meat and mushroom are also being used. Usually eaten with rice flakes (chiura), this dish is typically very spicy. 

It is considered a necessary part of the diet in festivals among the Newar community along with several other ingredients. It is also an important ingredient of Samay Baji.

References

Newari cuisine